Jordan Todorov (born May 29, 1980) is a Bulgarian documentary filmmaker, screenwriter, producer, and journalist. He graduated with an MA in Film Studies from the Krastyo Sarafov National Academy for Theatre and Film Arts in Sofia, Bulgaria in 2003.

Career

Filmmaking
Todorov made his writing and directing debut with Concrete Pharaohs (2010), a picturesque documentary about the Kalderash Roma – a closed community of no more than 1 million people all over the world. The film was produced by the Bulgarian company AGITPROP and became the first Bulgarian documentary commissioned by HBO. The film was shortlisted for the Japan Prize 2011 - the International Contest for Educational Media. Todorov served as a researcher for The Boy Who Was a King - a documentary that tells the story of Simeon Saxe-Coburg-Gotha, who at the age of six became the Tsar of Bulgaria. In 2011 Todorov has been commissioned by the Bulgarian National Television to direct the Twilight segment of the Bulgarian version of BBC's Big Read survey.

In 2011 Todorov wrote and directed the documentary Dad Made Dirty Movies (2011), that tells the story of the late American sexploitation producer and director Stephen C. Apostolof. The idea of the documentary dawned on Todorov in 2005, when he received an odd email from a friend: "Look who filmed the erotic scripts by Ed Wood!". The film is produced by AGITPROP in association with Filmtank(Hamburg), ZDF and Arte. Principal photography began in New York City in December 2009, and continued in California, Nevada and Arizona in May 2010. Dad Made Dirty Movies features interviews with Apostolof's children and his third wife Shelley, stars from his films, cult filmmakers, film critics and film historians. Dad Made Dirty Movies premiered at Visions du Réel International Film Festival and played at more than thirty festivals around the world, including Sydney Underground Film Festival, Transilvania International Film Festival, Trieste Film Festival and Mumbai International Film Festival, among others. The film has been sold in more than thirty territories worldwide. Dad Made Dirty Movies will air on HBO in the autumn of 2012. In 2013 Todorov helped produce the short documentary film Plamen, which features the story of Plamen Goranov, who became a symbol of the Bulgarian social protest movement and a catalyst for nationwide protests and government resignations when on 20 February 2013 he set himself on fire in front of the Varna municipal building. In 2014 Todorov was awarded the MEDIA funded Nipkow Programm fellowship to develop his next documentary film in Berlin - a portrait of the iconic photographer Will McBride.

Journalism
Todorov began his career as a journalist in 2002, working for the weekly newspaper 168 Hours, where he spent several years writing feature stories, interviews and news. Through the years he has earned a reputation for writing about offbeat subjects and characters in a humorous and somewhat surreal way. As a freelance journalist Todorov has written on a wide range of subjects for a number of publications as diverse as Playboy, Esquire, Fotogeschichte,L'Europeo, Vice, Capital, Amica, Expresso, Brava Casa and Abitare. He worked as staff editor for the Bulgarian edition of Rolling Stone until the magazine's closure in September 2011. Todorov has interviewed an array of prominent international figures. His feature interview subjects have included Dita Von Teese, Forrest J Ackerman, Scott Alexander and Larry Karaszewski, Kevin Warwick, Amos Oz, Isabel Allende, Aubrey De Grey, Alison Goldfrapp, Richard Kern, George Lois, Mark Benecke, Alain de Botton, Bunny Yeager, and Georgina Spelvin among others. He authored a biography of Stephen C. Apostolof due to be published in mid-2012 as a tie-in to his most recent documentary Dad Made Dirty Movies. Todorov was a managing editor of the Bulgarian edition of Max. He writes for Atlas Obscura - an online compendium of "The World's Wonders, Curiosities, and Esoterica”.

Other

In 2011 he was a member of the FIPRESCI jury at the 15th Sofia International Film Festival. The next year he was a member of the jury at the 10th In the Palace International Short Film Festival. In October 2013, Todorov curated "Bunny's Pin-up Girls" - an exhibition of photos by the American photographer Bunny Yeager in Sofia, Bulgaria. In 2016 he translated into Bulgarian the New York Times bestseller Savage Harvest: A Tale of Cannibals, Colonialism, and Michael Rockefeller’s Tragic Quest for Primitive Art - a non-fiction book about the mysterious disappearance of Michael Rockefeller in New Guinea in 1961. Todorov also translated into Bulgarian River of the Sacred Monkey (1970) – a travelogue detailing the adventures of Dimitar Krustev (1920-2013), a Bulgarian-born artist and adventurer, who in 1968 became the first person to successfully navigate the Usumacinta River on the border of Mexico and Guatemala.

Filmography
 Plamen (2015)(Producer)
 Dad Made Dirty Movies (2011)(Director/Writer)
 The Boy Who Was a King (2011)(Researcher)
 Concrete Pharaohs (2010)(Director/Writer)

Bibliography

Dad Made Dirty Movies: The Erotic World of Stephen C. Apostolof (McFarland) 
Реката на свещената маймуна (original title River of the Sacred Monkey) (Erove) 
Дивашка жътва (original title Savage Harvest: A Tale of Cannibals, Colonialism, and Michael Rockefeller’s Tragic Quest for Primitive Art) (Erove) 
Atlas Obscura Explorer's Journal (Workman Publishing Company) 
 Bulgarian cinema. Encyclopedia (Titra)

Awards and honors
 2014: Nipkow Fellowship awarded by Nipkow Programm - Berlin
 2012: Bulgarian Film Academy Award for Best Television Documentary for "Dad Made Dirty Movies"
 2012: The 16th Sofia International Film Fest Young Jury Award for Best Documentary for "Dad Made Dirty Movies"
 2011: Bulgarian Film Academy Award for Best Debut Film for "Concrete Pharaohs"
 2011: Japan Prize shortlist - "Concrete Pharaohs"
 2011: The 15th International Festival of Documentary Films in Jihlava, Czech Republic, Silver Eye Award Nomination for Best Mid-Length Documentary for "Dad Made Dirty Movies" 
 2010: Golden Rhyton Festival of Non-Feature Film Award for Best Debut Film for "Concrete Pharaohs"
 2010: The 14th International Festival of Documentary Films in Jihlava, Czech Republic, Silver Eye Award Nomination for Best Mid-Length Documentary for "Concrete Pharaohs" 
 2010: The 14th International Festival of Documentary Films in Jihlava, Czech Republic, Silver Eye Award Nomination for Best Central and Eastern European Documentary for "Concrete Pharaohs" 
 2008: Best journalist story/campaign/publication nomination at the 6th Right to Know Awards, organized by Freedom of Information Advocates
Network

References

External links
 
 Official website 
 An interview with Jordan Todorov
 The Bulgarian, who broke Hollywood taboos
 "The most successful Bulgarian in Hollywood, we’ve never heard of"
 “Papá hace películas obscenas”, la historia del búlgaro con mayor éxito en Hollywood
 Jordan Todorov Interview about the making of "Dad Made Dirty Movies"(in Bulgarian)

1980 births
Living people
Bulgarian documentary film directors
Bulgarian film directors
Bulgarian screenwriters
Male screenwriters
Bulgarian journalists